Árpád Szenes (also ; 6 May 1897, Budapest – 16 January 1985, Paris) was a Hungarian-Jewish abstract painter who worked in France.

Biography

In 1897, Szenes was born into a petty bourgeois family in Budapest. Many artists including Arthur Bárdos, Ignotus, Lajos Hatvany were guests in the family's home. He went to the Munkácsy Mihály Street Secondary Grammar School and was taught among others by Milán Füst. He was passionate about drawing. He served in World War I, but he did not come to the front; he painted portraits on the graves of heroic fallen soldiers from photos. Here he was recognized by the sculptor Dezső Bokros Birman, who directed him towards modern art. He enrolled in the free school of József Rippl-Rónai, where Béla Iványi-Grünwald and Károly Kernstok had great influence on him.

In 1919 he worked with his fellow painters at the Artist Colony of Kecskemét. Since they did not receive money, they had to do agricultural work. He painted together among others with Gyula Derkovits, Béla Iványi-Grünwald, János Kmetty, Róbert Emil Novotny and Pál Pátzay. He was ill with hard physical work, and moved with two friends to a business premise in Városmajor Street in Budapest. At that time, he met István Beöthy, with whom they studied Buddhism and Oriental art. His style was not mature yet: in 1922 he exhibited abstract artwork at a group exhibition of young artists at Ernst Museum, but his other paintings of the same year reflect the traditions of the Hungarian painting of the turn of the century and the influence of his masters. He went on a European study trip; the first station was in Germany in 1924, where he met with the works of Kandinsky and Klee, and then studied the paintings of Giotto and Piero della Francesca in Italy. He first visited Paris in 1924, then only for three months, then again in the autumn of 1925 for staying. The money that he received from his uncle was gone, and for months he was in extreme poverty, and as advised by László Ney lived on cartoons made from guests at Montmartre cafés. Many Hungarians lived in Paris, in addition to his mother, György Marton, Zsigmond Kolozsvári and Gábor Peterdi helped Szenes artistically. At this time he already had exhibitions, and while he was having a bohemian lifestyle with many affairs, he was also attending the Académie de la Grande Chaumière. Here he met in 1929 with Portuguese Maria Helena Vieira da Silva and they married in 1930, his wife became a Hungarian citizen, and remained until 1956. After marriage, he lived a more restrained life.

In 1930, the couple visited the Nagybánya artists' colony. They lived and worked in a dead end called rue des Camelias in Paris, where many artists lived. They met Lajos Tihanyi's friend, Kokoschka and Varèse, but Jacques Lipchitz also visited them. Later they moved to boulevard Saint Jacques where their studio was above a cardboard factory. Through their patron and gallery owner, Jeanne Bucher, they were in close contact with Joan Miró and Max Ernst.

At that time Szenes visited the café gatherings of Les Amis du Monde, a group of young left-wing artists including Étienne Hajdú, Maurice Estève, Édouard Pignon, André Breton, Louis Aragon. Through his wife, he contacted the Stanley William Hayter-led Atelier 17 studio which inspired his surrealist works from the 1930s.

At the outbreak of World War II they left Paris, leaving Jeanne Bucher their studio and pictures. They spent a few months in Lisbon, where Szenes had an independent exhibition, and then went to Brazil in 1940. They lived in Rio de Janeiro for some time, then settled in nearby Santa Teresa. The art community in Rio was less inspirational than in Paris; although they met Dr. Atl and some other painters, they were more involved with poets and writers at this time. He painted nature, portraits of writers, poets and illustrated books. He founded a painting school called Sylvestre, taught amateurs and young Brazilian modernists.

In 1947 they returned to Paris, regained the boulevard Saint Jacques studio and Szenes continued to teach. At that time he started working on perhaps his most significant series of geometric and organic shapes, repetitive motifs called 'Bankett' made of various techniques (watercolor, gouache, oil, pastel and chalk). Meanwhile, he painted portraits of Vieira da Silva, making hundreds of paintings altogether. The French state bought from his paintings for the first time in 1949, followed by several state purchases. From the mid-1950s his expression became cleaner. On his landscapes the vertical-horizontal relationship is of great significance, his color scale has been reduced to a few pale colors. From then on, his wife Vieira da Silva became more and more renowned while his popularity diminished.

In 1979 he donated seven works made between 1942 and 1970 to the Museum of Fine Arts in Budapest and the Janus Pannonius Museum in Pécs. After his death and the end of communism in Hungary, Vieira da Silva established a foundation in 1990 in Lisbon with their names for the promotion of young artists. The museum building in Praça das Amoreiras 58 was previously a silk factory.

He died at age 87 from a pulmonary edema, in 1985.

List of works

Works in books

Chapters Pierre Guéguen: La chasse au faon rose (ed. Cahiers d'Art, 1938) c. book of
Illustrations for Murilo Mendes, Rainer-Maria Rilke, Jorge de Lima, 1944
Fifty gouache René Char Le Temps épars c. manuscript, 1966
Gravures (ed. F. Mermod), Lausanne, 1968.

His works in public collections

Solomon R. Guggenheim Museum, New York
Musée National d'Art Moderne, Paris
Musée des Beaux-Arts, Dijon
Musée des Beaux-Arts, Rennes
Musée des Beaux-Arts, Rouen
M. Figueira da Foz (POR)
Musée canton des Beaux-Arts, Lausanne
Musée Fabre, Montpellier
M. Bezalel, Jerusalem
Museum of Fine Arts, Budapest
Janus Pannonius Museum, Pécs
M. Nacional, Rio de Janeiro
Kunsthalle, Zurich
Center d'Art contemporain, Abbaye de Beaulieu.
exhibitions
Individual exhibitions

1933 - Galerie UP [engraving by Julian Trevelyan], Paris

1939, 1949, 1952, 1955, 1974 - Galerie Jeanne Bucher, Paris

1941 - Press House, Rio de Janeiro

1947 - Quelques français et des peintres, sculpteurs et graveurs hongrois de l'Ecole de Paris, Galerie de Bussy, Paris

1957 - Galerie Betty Thommen, Basel

1958 - Galerie Pierre, Paris

1960, 1965, 1969 - Galerie de Cahiers d'Art, Paris

1961 - Galerie du Grand Chene, Lausanne

1965 - Galerie Alice Pauli, Lausanne - Galerie 27, Oslo

1969, 1974, 1981, 1988 - Galerie Jacob, Paris

1968 - Paysages accordés, Galerie Alice Pauli, Lausanne

1970 - Galerie Régence, Brussels

1971-1973 - Retrospective - Musée des Beaux-Arts d'Orleans - Fundaçao Calouste Gulbekian, Lisbon - Rennes - Lille - Nantes - Rouen

1974 - Musée d'Art Moderne de la Ville de Paris, Paris (Retrospective)

1975 - Musée Fabre, Montpellier - Galerie Michel Vokaer, Brussels

1976 - Dessins d'Arpad Szenes and de Vieira da Silva, Center Georges Pompidou, Paris

1977 - Hungarian National Gallery, Budapest - Janus Pannonius Museum, Pécs - G. Information, Tunis

1982 - Hommage à Arpad Senes, M. Ingres, Montauban

1983-1984 - Musée des Beaux-Arts de Dijon - G. EMI, Lisbon

1985 - Fundaçao Calouste Gulbekian, Lisbon

1985 - Hommage à Arpad Senes, Galerie Jeanne Bucher and Galerie Jacob, Paris

1986 - Nasoni G., Porto - Fundaçao Calouste Gulbekian, Lisbon

1987 - Fundaçao Calouste Gulbekian, Lisbon - Bertrand G., Lisbon

1989 - Modern Art Museum, Porto

1994 - Budapest Historical Museum, [Vieira da Silva]

1995 - Hommage à Vieira da Silva et ~, Abbaye de Beaulieu, Ginals (FR)

1997 - Fundaçao Árpád Senes-Vieira da Silva, Lisbon (retrospective)

1999 - Portraits of [Vieira da Silva], Fine Arts Museum, Budapest

2000 - Salle St. Jean, Hôtel de Ville de Paris - Fundaçao Calouste Gulbekian, Lisbon

Most important group exhibitions

1931, 1933, 1934, 1936, 1937, 1956 - Salon des Surindépendants, Paris

1932 - Salon d'Automne, Salon des Tuileries, Paris

1936 - Atelier 17, Leicester Gallery, London - New painting from Europe, East River Gallery, New York

1938 - Hungarian Artists in Paris, Tamás Gallery, Budapest - École de Paris, Galerie Jeanne Bucher, Paris

1944 - Atelier 17, Modern Art Museum, New York

1948 - French, Spanish and Hungarian Artists, National Salon, Budapest

1948, 1953, 1960, 1961, 1966, 1967 - Salon de Mai, Paris

1952 - Rythme et couleurs, Musée Cantonal, Lausanne - Les peintres d'aujourd'hui in Paris, Kunsthaus, Zurich

1953 - Biennale de Sao Paolo

1955 - The Movement of Contemporary Art, Musée Cantonal, Lausanne

1957 - French art, Zagreb - Belgrade

1959 - from Manet to the present, Warsaw - Hommage à Monet, Galerie Art Vivant, Paris - 80 Maler der Ecole de Paris, 1900-1959 - Vienna - Linz

1959, 1960 - Documenta II. and III, Kassel

1960 - Hommage à Jeanne Bucher, Galerie Jeanne Bucher - La Peinture française d'aujourd'hui, Museum of Tel Aviv - M. Bezalel, Jerusalem

1961 - Stedelijk M., Amsterdam

1962 - "French Rysunki XVII-XX S", Warsa
w
1962, 1968 - Salon des Réalités Nouvelles, Paris

1963 - Contemporary French Painting, National Gallery, Salisbury

1966 - Dix ans d'art living 1945-1955, Fondation Maeght, St. Paul de Vence (FR)

1967 - Dix ans d'art vivant 1955-1965, Fondation Maeght, St. Paul de Vence (FR) - Galerie Jacob, Paris - Les quatre éléments, Galerie Cimaise, Paris

1968 - Painting in France 1900-1967 (traveling exhibition), Washington, New York, Chicago, San Francisco, Montreal - L'uso de la peinture [with Bryn, Zack], Galerie La Roue, Paris

1969 - Hommage à René Char, Musée de Céret

1970 - Hungarians from Paris, Galerie Zunini, Paris - 20th Century Hungarian Artists Abroad, Műcsarnok, Budapest

1971 - Hommage à Christian et Yvonne Zervos, Grand Palais, Pari

1979 - Spring Exhibition, Hungarian House, Paris - Présence Paris-Budapest, Orangerie des Jardins du Luxembourg

1982 - Honor to your homeland. Artists living abroad with Hungarian descent II. exhibition, Műcsarnok.

References

External links 
 Fundação Arpad Szenes-Vieira da Silva (in Portuguese)

1897 births
1985 deaths
20th-century French painters
20th-century French male artists
French male painters
Hungarian painters
19th-century Hungarian Jews
Hungarian emigrants to France
People from Pest, Hungary